Jana Fischerová (born 20 August 1955) is a Czech politician who served in the Chamber of Deputies from 2010 to 2017.

Fischerová was born in 1955 in Havlíčkův Brod. She studied civil engineering at the Czech Technical University in Prague, earning her CSc. degree in 1986.

From 2006 to 2010, Fischerová served as the mayor of Havlíčkův Brod. In the 2010 Czech legislative elections, she was elected to the Chamber of Deputies as a member of the Civic Democratic Party (ODS). She was reelected in the 2013 elections. During her second term she was vice-chair of the Committee on Foreign Affairs.

In addition to her involvement in national politics, Fischerová was a representative to the Parliamentary Assembly of the Council of Europe from 2010 to 2014 and was a substitute representative from 2015 to 2017.

References 

1955 births
Living people
Politicians from Havlíčkův Brod
21st-century Czech women politicians
Members of the Chamber of Deputies of the Czech Republic (2010–2013)
Members of the Chamber of Deputies of the Czech Republic (2013–2017)
Civic Democratic Party (Czech Republic) MPs
Czech Technical University in Prague alumni
Mayors of places in the Czech Republic